Ramanuj Prasad Yadav is an Indian politician. He was elected to the Bihar Legislative Assembly from Sonpur as 2015 Member of Bihar Legislative Assembly as a member of the Rashtriya Janata Dal.

References

Bihar MLAs 2005–2010
Bihar MLAs 2015–2020
Bihar MLAs 2020–2025
Bihari politicians
Rashtriya Janata Dal politicians
People from Saran district
1959 births
Living people